Crambus palustrellus is a species of moth in the family Crambidae. It is found in France.

The wingspan is 17–18 mm.

References

Moths described in 1876
Crambini
Moths of Europe